Alison Gail Smith, Lady Hopper  is Professor of Plant Biochemistry in the Department of Plant Sciences at the University of Cambridge, UK. Her research investigates the metabolism of plants, algae and bacteria, in particular vitamin and cofactor biosynthesis.

Education
Smith was educated at the University of Bristol where she was awarded a Bachelor of Science degree in biochemistry in 1977. She moved to the University of Cambridge, to do a Ph.D. investigating the role of a toxin produced by the bacterium Pseudomonas syringae in causing the symptoms of halo blight of green beans, which she completed in 1981.

Research and career
Smith's research investigates the: 

Research in Smith's group is also investigating the potential for exploitation of algae for carbon capture and storage, algae fuel and algaculture. Her research has been funded by the European Union, the Biotechnology and Biological Sciences Research Council, the Engineering and Physical Sciences Research Council, the Economic and Social Research Council and the Natural Environment Research Council.

She is a council member of the Marine Biological Association of the United Kingdom of the United Kingdom and as a member of the board of the National Institute of Agricultural Botany.

Awards and honours
Smith was awarded a Leverhulme Trust Study Abroad Fellowship in 2001 and a best scientific paper award from the Rebeiz Foundation for Basic Research in 2009 for research on Tetrapyrrole profiling in seedlings of the Arabidopsis (rockcress). In 2009, she was awarded an Erskine Fellowship from the University of Canterbury in Christchurch, New Zealand, and she became a Fellow of the Royal Society of Biology (FRSB) in 2012.

Smith was interviewed by Jim Al-Khalili on The Life Scientific, first broadcast on BBC Radio 4 in 2017.

Personal life
Smith is married to computer scientist Andy Hopper (Sir Andrew Hopper), with whom she has two children.

References

Living people
Fellows of the Royal Society of Biology
Alumni of the University of Cambridge
British botanists
British biochemists
Academics of the University of Cambridge
Alumni of the University of Bristol
Year of birth missing (living people)
Wives of knights